Cornelius Lyons ( – c. 1740) was an Irish harper and composer of harp tunes. He was the harper of the Earl of Antrim. Donnchadh Ó hAmhsaigh, known in English as Denis Hempson also a harper, was a great admirer of Cornelius Lyons and played a number of fine baroque-style variation sets by Lyons. Only one of the tunes Lyons composed survives; this is "Miss Hamilton" (Inion i Hamilton). However Lyons wrote variations on existing tunes of which five have survived, including "The Coolin" and "Slieve Gallen". "Miss Hamilton" was written in 1706.

References

External links
Chapter V: Famous harpers of the seventeenth and later centuries; Bill Haneman

1670s births
1740s deaths
Year of birth unknown 
Year of death unknown 
17th-century Irish people
18th-century Irish people
People from County Kerry
Irish harpists